The 1917 Oxford by-election was held on 30 March 1917.  The by-election was held due to the elevation to a UK peerage of the incumbent Conservative MP, Lord Valentia, who became Baron Annesley of Bletchington. It was won by the Conservative candidate John Marriott who was unopposed due to a War-time electoral pact.

References

1917 in England
Elections in Oxford
1917 elections in the United Kingdom
By-elections to the Parliament of the United Kingdom in Oxfordshire constituencies
Unopposed by-elections to the Parliament of the United Kingdom (need citation)
20th century in Oxford